Adelbert Stone Hay (November 1, 1876 – June 23, 1901) was an American consul, politician and son of U.S. Secretary of State John Hay.

Life and death 
Hay was the eldest son of John Milton Hay, who served as United States Secretary of State and the United States Ambassador to Great Britain and Clara Louise Stone. He graduated from Yale in 1898.

Around 1900, Hay was appointed the United States Consul at Pretoria in South Africa during the Boer War. While in South Africa, Hay was in charge of 6,000 British prisoners of war in Pretoria and the financial interests of the British citizens there.

On June 23, 1901 Hay died when he fell sixty feet from a window in the New Haven House, in New Haven, Connecticut. The San Francisco Call  speculated that Hay was sitting on the window for air, eventually fell asleep and fell to his death. Hay would be interred in Cleveland, Ohio. At the time of his death, Hay was in the infancy of his political career; having just been appointed assistant secretary of the President William McKinley. The elder Hay and his wife were grief stricken by the death of their son.

References

American consuls
Connecticut politicians
1876 births
1901 deaths